Hot Bench is a nontraditional panel-based court show that made its debut in first-run syndication on September 15, 2014. The series is produced by Judge Judys Judge Judy Sheindlin, who also created the program and concept with executive producers Randy Douthit, Maureen FitzPatrick, and David Theodosopoulos and supervising producer James Glover for CBS Media Ventures.

Production and international airings
On December 11, 2014, Hot Bench was renewed for a second season. The show airs in the UK on TruTV, and in Canada on Yes TV and in syndication. The show has produced 1,535 episodes as of September 8, 2022.

Format
The series features a panel of three judges. The current panel consists of Michael Corriero, Rachel Juarez, and Yodit Tewolde, who preside over small-claims cases and then argue the merits of the case amongst themselves in the chamber room before rendering a verdict (under the format, only a majority – two of the three-panel members – need to agree on the verdict). 

Before them, the panel consisted of attorneys Tanya Acker and Larry Bakman along with former Brooklyn New York Supreme Court judge, Patricia DiMango. 

The panel acts as an arbitral tribunal, and as with most televised court shows, the cases are a form of binding arbitration in which the litigants forgo their actual lawsuit in favor of appearing on the program.

In October 2016, Bakman announced that he was leaving Hot Bench to focus on his law practice.  Bakman's final episodes originally aired on October 28, 2016, and Corriero's first episode was scheduled to originally air on November 1, 2016, with series creator Judge Judy Sheindlin and her husband, former The People's Court judge Jerry Sheindlin, serving as guest judges on the Halloween 2016 original broadcasts.

In the fall of 2022, DiMango and Acker were replaced on the show by Juarez and Tewolde, while Corriero assumed the chief judge position.

Conception
The concept was inspired by Judy's vacation to Ireland, a country which occasionally uses panels of three judges to handle one case: "When my husband Jerry and I were in Ireland recently, we visited the courts and watched a three-judge bench, which I found both fascinating and compelling." She added, "I immediately thought what a terrific and unique idea for a television program that brings the court genre to the next level. We have assembled three individuals with extremely varied backgrounds to serve as the judges. They are smart and talented, with terrific instincts and great chemistry, and are sure to create a 'hot bench'."

The bailiff is Sonia Montejano, who was also the bailiff for Judge Joe Brown from 2006 to its end in 2013.

References

External links 
 
 

2010s American legal television series
2010s American reality television series
2014 American television series debuts
2020s American legal television series
2020s American reality television series
Television shows filmed in Los Angeles
Arbitration courts and tribunals
Court shows
English-language television shows
First-run syndicated television programs in the United States
Television series by CBS Studios